Tom Emerson (born c. 1935) is a former Canadian football player who played for the Edmonton Eskimos. He played college football at the University of Oklahoma. Emerson was selected in the 28th round of the 1957 NFL Draft by the Chicago Bears, but did not play in the league.

References

1930s births
Living people
Canadian football tackles
Oklahoma Sooners football players
Edmonton Elks players